Allocasuarina mackliniana is a shrub of the genus Allocasuarina native to the western Victoria.

The shrub has smooth bark and ascending branchlets.

There are two known subspecies:
 Allocasuarina mackliniana subsp. mackliniana
 Allocasuarina mackliniana subsp. xerophila

References

External links
  Occurrence data for Allocasuarina mackliniana from The Australasian Virtual Herbarium

mackliniana
Flora of Victoria (Australia)
Fagales of Australia
Dioecious plants